Calliostoma conulus is a species of sea snail, a marine gastropod mollusk in the family Calliostomatidae. This is the type species of the genus.

The variety Calliostoma conulus var. livida Dautzenberg, 1927  is a synonym of Calliostoma lividum Dautzenberg, 1927

Description
The shell has an elevated-conical shape. The height of the shell varies between 10 mm and 35 mm. The shell is carinated at the periphery. It has a yellow or delicate flesh color, with obscure clouds or macula. It is alternately whitish and brown below the suture and painted on the peripheral rib in the same alternate manner. The surface of the shell is highly polished. The apical whorl is smooth, the next four or five whorls are densely granulate  (granules in 4 or 5 series). The next whorl is generally spirally ribbed.  The following whorls are smooth, or with very obscure traces of spiral lines. The base of the shell is flat, smooth, save for 3 to 6 concentric articulated riblets around the axis. The outlines of the spire are straight. There are about 10 flat whorls, separated by a linear suture with a distinct narrow supra-sutural fasciole. The rhomboidal aperture is smooth within. The pearly columella is shorter and more knobbed at its base than in  Calliostoma zizyphinum.

Distribution
This marine species occurs in European waters, off Spain and Portugal and in the Mediterranean Sea off Greece and Sicily; in the Atlantic Ocean off the Canary Islands, Madeira and the Azores.

References

 Gofas, S.; Le Renard, J.; Bouchet, P. (2001). Mollusca, in: Costello, M.J. et al. (Ed.) (2001). European register of marine species: a check-list of the marine species in Europe and a bibliography of guides to their identification. Collection Patrimoines Naturels, 50: pp. 180–213
 Oliverio, Marco (2006). Gastropoda Prosobranchia archeo, in: Revisione della Checklist della fauna marina italiana

External links
 

conulus
Gastropods described in 1758
Taxa named by Carl Linnaeus